Borhead is a Spanish DJ/electronic music producer. He started producing music in the late 1990s while taking an electronic music production course in his home town right outside Madrid. In 1999 he moved to Singapore, where he started DJing at private parties and soon he got his first residency @ Suede (Mohammed Sultan road) during Sunday nights.
Shortly after he participated in the creation of the reefonline brand of parties and events along with some friends and started playing for other events and clubs around the city like Eden, dbl 0, Solace @ Venom, and Nox among others. He also started getting bookings overseas and played in Station 3 in Melaka, Malaysia earning himself a reputation and a contract with Kinemat Productions. He then started taking part in Kinemat's techno night, Techkroniq @ Bugis' legendary club Insomnia and took part in Sentosa NYE 2001 warming up for John Digweed and a new years appearance in Pacha (Baqueira).

In 2002, Borhead played in Digit house club in Manresa, Pegasus in Shanghai and Asias biggest gay festival Nation 02 along top Sydney DJs Luke Leal (long time veteran of the world-famous Sydney Gay and Lesbian Mardi Gras) and Mark Alsop (who DJs recurrently at the Mardi Gras Recovery "Frisky" parties). Months later he became a sure bet for the Techkroniq series of parties sharing Phuture's (Zouk) booth with D.Knox and made the eventual appearance in Milieu.
To add to his residencies in clubs like Nox and Pinkk borhead also became a common DJ in the Singapore gay scene with regular gigs at the Box.

In 2003, the reef parties came out of the underground to a more mainstream crowd at venues such as tunnel without sacrificing the non mainstream qualities of the music played.

Kinemat took the risk of being the first crew to support a minimal techno/microhouse event in Zouk to celebrate their 5th birthday with Analog Girl, Voila (borhead & Don), Sutekh and Haris Custovic.

At this point Borhead had graced the decks of clubs across the world and could not stop getting booked for clubs such as trilogy (Dubai), Fun factory (madrid), returning to Pegasus (Shanghai)...

As an opportunity to celebrate his brother bruno's birthday in 2004, the "let's frloik!" series of parties was created.

In 2006, Borhead continued dishing out his best tunes in the Singaporean clubbing circuit along names like Interlace and with a residency at Liberte before moving back to his hometown, Madrid where he brought his reef brand to the local rave circuit and joined his brother Bruno a.k.a. Bruns to form the duo Side B where they made their début at reef's "Made in Madrid" @ Taboo.

It didn't take Borhead long before he moved back to Asia. He landed in the Philippines where he took a residencie in M Café along local crew Sounds Good with DJs Miss BadKiss and Adrian Cuenca featured in Spanish TV show "madrileños por el mundo". He also participated in the Rewired series in Warehouse 135 and the eventual appearance in Embassy Cuisine.

In 2008, Their début in let's frolik! 08 with Deetron was a great success raising over 2000GBP for Natural Justice in South Africa.

Back in Madrid, Borhead was seen in the local clubbing circuit playing nights in Copola Club or more regularly at underground reef parties in secret locations.

References

Spanish DJs
Living people
Year of birth missing (living people)